Chico Bennett is an American record producer, musician, and songwriter based in Los Angeles, California, United States. He has written, produced and/or remixed for Madonna, Lady Gaga, The Killers, Hilary Duff, Usher, Nelly Furtado and Destiny's Child.

A musician’s musician, Chico Bennett started his career in his early teens when he attracted the attention of music legend Prince, who gave him his first production job at the age of 19. Since that first production, Chico has continued writing, producing and remixing hits.

In 2000 Chico began developing music projects with w super DJ/Producer/Remixer Richard Vission. This proved to be such a great fit that the two soon formed a partnership. Among their other accomplishments, Bennett and Vission were nominated for a Grammy Award for Remixer Of The Year in 2001. That same year Chico began working with actress Hilary Duff. The actress had never recorded before but wanted to try her hand at it. Chico became a central player in Team Hilary and in the making of all her records and movie soundtrack work.

In 2003, Bennett founded the music production company Zero 1 Entertainment, Inc and Snaptime Music Publishing to develop new artist projects. Through Zero 1 Entertainment, Bennett has developed new artists Stranger Days, J1, Brig Feltus, and Kodi Hill. Always the musical chameleon, Chico has since worked with R&B Superstar Usher, Pop/Rock Princesses The Veronicas, Los Angeles Rap Artist Mann, and Mega Superstar Britney Spears to name a few.

In 2008 launched the label Captive Libertine Recordings, Inc. with artist Brig Feltus.

In early 2013 Chico Bennett and writing/production partner Richard Vission developed the pop group WTF (W3 The Future) who were signed to Young Money Records in the summer of 2013. Immediately following the WTF signing, Bennett and Vission, along with songwriter David “DQ” Quinones (Beyoncé’s “Halo”), collaborated on the development of hot new buzz artists My Crazy Girlfriend. The group signed to Capitol Records late 2013.

Select discography (writing/production/remix)

 Britney Spears
Don't Cry
Body Ache

 Jessica Mauboy featuring Stan Walker
 Galaxy

 Justice Crew
 Sexy And You Know It

 Alessandra Amoroso
 I'm a Woman
 Clip His Wings

 Enrique Iglesias
 Tonight (I'm F**kin You)

 Lady Gaga
 Bad Romance"

 The Black Eyed Peas
 Meet Me Halfway - Richard Vission Solmatic Remix

 Eva Simons
 Silly Boy - Silly Boy (Remixes)

 Lady Gaga
 Just Dance - Richard Vission Remixes

 OneRepublic
 Apologize Richard Vission Remixes

 Timbaland
 The Way I Are - Richard Vission Remixes

 Katy Perry
 I Kissed a Girl

 Weezer
 Troublemaker

 Pussycat Dolls
 Bottle Pop
 Stickwitu

 Sweetbox
 Rockstar

 Hilary Duff
 Never Stop
 Dignity
 Between You and Me
 Happy
 Outside Of You
 Any Other Day
 I Am
 Party Up
 Jericho
 Anywhere but Here
 The Little Voice
 Metamorphosis
 Why Not
 What Dreams Are Made Of ("Lizzie McGuire Soundtrack")

 Haylie Duff
 Girl in the Band ("Lizzie McGuire Soundtrack")

 RBD
 Besame Sin Miedo

 Justin Timberlake
 SexyBack

 Nelly Furtado
 Maneater
 Promiscuous
 Turn off the Light

 Gnarls Barkley
 Crazy

 Korn
 Coming Undone

 She Wants Revenge
 Tear You Apart

 Usher
 Caught Up
 You’ll Be In My Heart

 Sara Paxton
 Kiss Me Like You Mean It

 The Killers
 Mr. Brightside

 Bravery
 Fearless

 Sting
 Stolen Car

 Jessica Simpson
 Take My Breath Away

 Richard Humpty Vission
 Never Let Me Down

 Paulina Rubio
 Dame Tu Amour

 Enrique Iglesias
 Not In Love

 Madonna
 Hollywood
 What It Feels Like For A Girl
 Don't Tell Me
 Music
 American Pie

 Filter
 Where Do We Go From Here?

 Adrenaline
 Damn, That DJ Made My Day
 Shut The F*** Up And Dance

 Felix The House Cat
 Madam Hollywood

 Destiny's Child
 Bootylicious

 Ira Levi
 What Is Love

 Ta Gana
 More
 Anything
 Dance floor
 More Save The Last Dance

 Donika
 Ain't What I Expected

 Jeymes
 Ashes to Ashes

 Groove Junkies/ Mijan
 Music Is Life 

 Britney Spears
 Don't Cry

References

Year of birth missing (living people)
Living people
Place of birth missing (living people)
Record producers from California
American male songwriters